Iran participated in the 2009 Asian Youth Games held in Singapore from June 29, 2009 to July 7, 2009. This country is ranked 11th with one gold medal in this edition of the Youth Asiad.

Competitors

Medal summary

Medal table

Medalists

Results by event

3x3 basketball

Boys

Aquatics

Diving

Boys

Swimming

Boys

Athletics

Boys

Girls

Football

Boys

Shooting

Boys

Girls

Table tennis

Boys

Girls

References

External links
 Official website

Asian Youth Games
Nations at the 2009 Asian Youth Games
2009